The Kiautschou Bay Leased Territory was a German leased territory in  Imperial and Early Republican China from 1898 to 1914. Jiaozhou became romanized as Kiaochow, Kiauchau or Kiao-Chau in English and as  Kiautschou or Kiaochau in German. The administrative center was at Tsingtau (Pinyin Qingdao). It was operated by the East Asia Squadron of the Imperial German Navy. The Russian Empire resented the German move as an infringement on Russian ambitions in the region.

Background of German expansion in China
Germany was a relative latecomer to the imperialistic scramble for colonies across the globe. A German colony in China was envisioned as a two-fold enterprise: as a coaling station to support a global naval presence, and because it was felt that a German colonial empire would support the economy in the mother country. Densely populated China was viewed as a potential market to be exploited, with thinkers such as Max Weber demanding an active colonial policy from the government. In particular the opening of China was made a high priority, because it was thought to be the most important non-European market in the world.

However, a global policy (Weltpolitik) without global military influence appeared impracticable, so, assessing that Britain's great strength came from its navy, the Germans began to build one too. This fleet was supposed to serve German interests during peace through gunboat diplomacy, and in times of war, through commerce raiding, to protect German trade routes and disrupt hostile ones. Imitating Britain, a network of global naval bases was a key requirement for this intention.

Again, intending to directly copy Britain, the acquisition of a harbor in China was from the start intended to be a model colony: all installations, the administration, the surrounding infrastructure and the utilization thereof was to show the Chinese, the German nation itself, and other colonial powers an effective colonial policy.

German acquisition of the territory

In 1860, a Prussian expeditionary fleet arrived in Asia and explored the region around Jiaozhou Bay. The following year, the Prussian-Chinese Treaty of Peking was signed. After journeys to China between 1868 and 1871, the geographer Baron Ferdinand von Richthofen recommended the Bay of Jiaozhou as a possible naval base. In 1896 Rear Admiral Alfred von Tirpitz, at that time commander of the East Asian Cruiser Division, examined the area personally as well as three additional sites in China for the establishment of a naval base. Rear Admiral Otto von Diederichs replaced Tirpitz in East Asia and focused on Jiaozhou Bay even though the Berlin admiralty had not formally decided on a base location.

On 1 November 1897, the Big Sword Society murdered two German Roman Catholic priests of the Steyler Mission in Juye County in southern Shandong. This event was known as the "Juye Incident." Admiral von Diederichs, commander of the cruiser squadron, wired on 7 November 1897 to the admiralty: "May incidents be exploited in pursuit of further goals?" Upon receipt of the Diederichs cable, chancellor Chlodwig von Hohenlohe counseled caution, preferring a diplomatic resolution. However, Kaiser Wilhelm II intervened and the admiralty sent a message for Diederichs to "proceed immediately to Kiautschou with entire squadron ..." to which the admiral replied "will proceed ... with greatest energy."

Diederichs at that moment only had his division's flagship SMS Kaiser and the light cruiser SMS Prinzess Wilhelm available at anchor at Shanghai, the corvette SMS Arcona was laid up for repairs and the light cruiser SMS Irene in a dockyard at Hong Kong for an engine refit. The shallow draft small cruiser SMS Cormoran, operating independent of the cruiser division, was patrolling the Yangtze. Diederichs weighed anchor, ordered Prinzess Wilhelm to follow next day and Cormoran to catch up at sea. The three ships arrived off Tsingtau after dawn on 13 November 1897 but made no aggressive moves. With his staff and the three captains of his ships aboard, Diederichs landed with his admirals tender at Tsingtau's long Zhanqiao Pier to reconnoiter. He determined that his landing force would be vastly outnumbered by Chinese troops, but he had qualitative superiority.

At 06.00, Sunday, 14 November 1897, Cormoran steamed into the inner harbor to provide inshore fire support, if necessary. Kaiser and Prinzess Wilhelm cleared boats to carry an amphibious force of 717 officers, petty officers and sailors armed with rifles. Diederichs on horseback and his column marched toward the Chinese main garrison and artillery battery, a special unit swiftly disabled the Chinese telegraph line and others occupied the outer forts and powder magazines. With speed and effectiveness, Diederichs’ actions had achieved their primary objective by 08.15.

Signalmen restored the telegraph line, and the first messages were received and deciphered. Diederichs was stunned to learn that his orders had been canceled, and that he was to suspend operations at Kiautschou pending negotiations with the Chinese government. If he had already occupied the village of Tsingtau, he was to consider his presence temporary. He responded, thinking the politicians in Berlin had lost their nerve to political or diplomatic complications: "Proclamation already published. ... Revocation not possible." After considerable time and uncertainty, the admiralty finally cabled congratulations and the proclamation to remain in effect; Wilhelm II promoted him to vice admiral.

Admiral von Diederichs consolidated his positions at Kiautschou Bay. The admiralty dispatched the protected cruiser SMS Kaiserin Augusta from the Mediterranean to Tsingtau to further strengthen the naval presence in East Asia. On 26 January 1898 the marines of III. Seebataillon arrived on the liner Darmstadt. Kiautschou Bay was now secure.

Negotiations with the Chinese government began and on 6 March 1898 the German Empire retreated from outright cession of the area and accepted a leasehold of the bay for 99 years, or until 1997, as the British were soon to do with Hong Kong's New Territories and the French with Kouang-Tchéou-Wan. One month later the Reichstag ratified the treaty on 8 April 1898. Kiautschou Bay was officially placed under German protection by imperial decree on 27 April and Kapitän zur See [captain] Carl Rosendahl was appointed governor. These events ended Admiral von Diederichs' responsibility (but not his interest) in Kiautschou; he wrote that he had "fulfilled [his] purpose in the navy."

As a result of the lease treaty, the Chinese government gave up the exercise of its sovereign rights within the leased territory of approximately 83,000 inhabitants (to which the city of Kiautschou was excluded), as well as in a 50 km wide neutral zone ("neutrales Gebiet"). According to international law, the leased territory ("territoire à bail") remained legally part of China but for the duration of the lease, all sovereign powers were to be exercised by Germany.

Moreover, the treaty included rights for construction of railway lines and mining of local coal deposits. Many parts of Shandong outside of the German leased territory came under German economic influence. Although the lease treaty set limits to the German expansion, it became a starting point for the following cessions of Port Arthur and Dalian to Russia to support Russia's Chinese Eastern Railway interests in Manchuria, of the transfer of Weihai and Liu-kung Tao Island from Japan to Great Britain, and the cession of Kwang-Chou-Wan to support France in southern China and Indochina.

Later history

On 15 August 1914, at the outbreak of World War I in Europe, Japan delivered an ultimatum to Germany demanding that it relinquish its control of the disputed territory of Kiaoutschou. Upon rejection of the ultimatum, Japan declared war on 23 August and the same day its navy bombarded the German territory. On 7 November 1914, the bay was occupied by Japanese forces (see Siege of Tsingtao). Following resolution of the Shandong Problem, the occupied territory was returned to China on 10 December 1922 but the Japanese again occupied the area from 1937 to 1945 during the Second Sino-Japanese War.

Language

The local language was the Qingdao dialect of Jiaoliao Mandarin. A German pidgin developed as well.

Organization and development of the territory
As the territory was not strictly speaking a colony but a lease, and because of its importance to the German navy, it was not placed under the supervision of the Imperial Colonial Office (Reichskolonialamt) but instead under that of the Imperial Naval Office (the Reichsmarineamt or RMA).

At the top of the territory stood the governor (all five office holders were senior navy officers), who was directly subordinated to the secretary of state of the RMA, Alfred von Tirpitz. The governor was head of both the military administration (run by the chief of staff and deputy governor), and the civil administration (managed by the Zivilkommissar). Further important functionaries of Kiautschou were the official for the construction of the harbor, and after 1900 the chief justice and the Commissioner for Chinese Affairs. The Gouvernementsrat [government council of the territory] and after 1902 the Chinese Committee advised the governor. The departments of finance, construction, education and medical services were directly subordinated to the governor, because these were crucial with regard to the idea of a model colony.

Kiautschou was modernised, with Germany investing upwards of $100 million. The impoverished fishing village of Tsingtau was laid out with wide streets, solid housing areas, government buildings, electrification throughout, a sewer system and a safe drinking water supply, a rarity in large parts of Asia at that time and later. The area had the highest density of schools and highest per capita student enrollment in all of China, with primary, secondary and vocational schools funded by the Berlin treasury and Protestant and Roman Catholic missions.

With the expansion of economic activity and public works, German banks opened branch offices, the Deutsch-Asiatische Bank being the most prominent. The completion of the Shantung Railroad in 1910 provided a connection to the Trans-Siberian Railway and thus allowed travel by train from Tsingtau to Berlin.

After the 1911 Revolution, many wealthy Chinese and politically connected ex-officials settled in the leased territory because of the safe and orderly environment it offered. Sun Yat-sen visited the Tsingtau area and stated in 1912, “... I am impressed. The city is a true model for China’s future.”

Governors

All Governors of the Kiautschou Bay Leased Territory were high-ranking officers of the Imperial German Navy.

See also
 China–Germany relations
 German colonial empire
 Eulenburg expedition
 Kiautschou Governor's Hall, located in Qingdao.
 Tsingtao Brewery, Germany's enduring legacy to Chinese brewing
 Tsingtauer Neueste Nachrichten

Notes

Bibliography
 Ganz, Albert Harding, John A. Moses, and Paul Kennedy. "The German Navy in the Far East and Pacific: The Seizure of Kiautschou and After." Germany in the Pacific and Far East 1914–1870 (1977) pp: 115-136.

Gottschall, Terrell D. By Order of the Kaiser, Otto von Diederichs and the Rise of the Imperial German Navy 1865–1902. Annapolis: Naval Institute Press. 2003. 
Schrecker, John E. Imperialism and Chinese Nationalism; Germany in Shantung. Cambridge, MA: Harvard University Press. 1971.
 Schrecker, John E. "Kiautschou and the problems of German colonialism." in Germany in the Pacific and Far East 1914-1870 (1977): 185-208.

Steinmetz, George. The Devils' Handwriting: Precoloniality and the German Colonial State in Qingdao, Samoa, and Southwest Africa. Chicago: University of Chicago Press, 2007.
 Stephenson, Charles. Germany's Asia-Pacific Empire: Colonialism and Naval Policy, 1885-1914 (2009) online review

In German
Schultz-Naumann, Joachim. Unter Kaisers Flagge, Deutschlands Schutzgebiete im Pazifik und in China einst und heute [Under the Kaiser's Flag, Germany's Protectorates in the Pacific and in China then and today]. Munich: Universitas Verlag. 1985.

External links 
 German colonies (in German)
WorldStatesmen
 Monetary history of Kiautschou.

Concessions in China
Former countries in Chinese history
Former German colonies
Geography of Shandong
History of Shandong
History of Qingdao
China–Germany relations
Georgist communities
City-states
1898 establishments in the German colonial empire
1898 establishments in Asia
1998 disestablishments in Asia